Sing Along With Skankin' Pickle is the third studio album by the American ska punk band Skankin' Pickle. It was released on Dill Records in 1994. Four of the bandmembers contributed to the songwriting. The band supported the album with a North American tour.

The album was re-issued on Asian Man Records in 1999.

Track list
"Rotten Banana Legs" (Knackstedt) – 3:03
"$13,000 Is A Lot Of Food!" (Park) – 1:59
"Turning Japanese" (The Vapors) – 3:12
"Onyonghasayo" (Park) – 1:31
"Take A Look" (Knackstedt) – 2:05
"I'm In Love With A Girl Named Spike" (Park) – 1:35
"Smorgasborgnine" (Nylander) – 2:03
"Go Home Now" (Park) – 2:08
"Thick Ass Stout" (Nylander) – 4:53
"20 Nothing" (Miller) – 3:59
"It's Margaret Cho" (Park) – 1:26
"Hate" (Park) – 1:54
"As Close As You Think" (Nylander/Knackstedt) – 2:08
"Pabu Boy" (Park) – 1:15
"Watch Your Tone" (Phelps/Knackstedt) – 7:15
Hidden track – 1:48

Personnel
Lynette Knackstedt - guitar, vocals, lead vocals on tracks 1, 5, 8 and 15
Gerry "Hulk Hogan" Lundquist - slide trombone, vocals
Chuck Phelps - drums
Ian "Guru" Miller - bass, vocals, lead vocals on track 10
Lars Nylander - valve trombone, vocals, lead vocals on tracks 7, 12 and 13
Mike "Bruce Lee" Park - saxophone, vocals, lead vocals on tracks 2, 3, 4, 6, 8, 11 and 14

Additional musicians
Darren Fletcher - keyboards on track 11
"Smokin'" Neal Okin - trumpet on tracks 5, 7, 9 and 13

Production
Engineered by Oscar Autie
Recorded at UOS $ Studios 
Mixed at Different Fur Studios

References

1994 albums
Skankin' Pickle albums
Asian Man Records albums